Jean Haudry (born 28 May 1934) is a French linguist and Indo-Europeanist. Haudry is generally regarded as a distinguished linguist by other scholars, although he has also been criticized for his political proximity with the far-right. Haudry's L'Indo-Européen, published in 1979, remains the reference introduction to the Proto-Indo-European language written in French.

Biography 
Jean Haudry was born on 28 May 1934 in Le Perreux-sur-Marne, in the eastern suburbs of Paris. He became agrégé in grammar studies at the École Normale Supérieure in 1959, and earned a PhD in linguistics in 1975 after a thesis on Vedic Sanskrit grammatical cases.

From 1974–1975, he has been a member of the patronage committee of Nouvelle École, a review published by GRECE, an ethno-nationalist think tank led by Alain de Benoist. Haudry acted as the chairman of GRECE at its 13th symposium in 1978.

Haudry was a member of the Institute of Formation of the Front National (FN) of Jean-Marie Le Pen. He also served in the "Scientific Council" of the FN until the late 1990s, when he decided to follow Bruno Mégret and his splinter party Mouvement National Républicain.

In 1980, he co-founded with GRECE members  and Jean Varenne the "Institute of Indo-European Studies" (IEIE) at the Jean Moulin University Lyon 3. Under his leadership between 1982 and 1998, the IEIE published the journal Études indo-européennes. He was a professor of Sanskrit and dean of the faculty of letters at the University Lyon 3 and a directeur d'études at the 4th section of the École Pratique des Hautes Études. He became professor emeritus in 2002.

In 1995, he participated in the founding of the nativist movement Terre et Peuple, along with Pierre Vial and Jean Mabire.

Soon after Jean Haudry's retirement, the French Ministry of Education appointed a commission to investigate whether Haudry's institute was not too closely associated with the far-right. The work of the commission was mooted when Haudry's successor, Jean-Paul Allard dissolved the institute and reconstituted it as an association free from state supervision.

Indo-European Studies

Three-sky model 
In his most important work on comparative mythology, La Religion cosmique des Indo-Européens (1987; "The cosmic religion of Indo-Europeans"), Haudry argued that Proto-Indo-European cosmogony featured three 'skies' (diurnal, nocturnal and liminal) each having its own set of deities and colours (white, red, and dark). The proposition is often mentioned in handbooks, although it has been criticized by some scholars as an "overinterpretation" of available data.

Arctic hypothesis 
Haudry has supported the Arctic hypothesis of the origin of Indo-Europeans.

Works

References

Bibliography

 
  (adapted from )
 
 
 
 
 
 

1934 births
Indo-Europeanists
Living people
Academic staff of the University of Lyon
French modern pagans
New Right (Europe)